"Seems Like Old Times" is a popular song, with music and lyrics by Carmen Lombardo and John Jacob Loeb.

It was originally recorded by Guy Lombardo's orchestra (vocal by Don Rodney) on November 15, 1945 and released by Decca Records as catalog number 18737. Hit versions in 1946 were by Lombardo (No. 7 in the charts), Vaughn Monroe (also No. 7) and Kate Smith (No. 12). 

The recording by Joe Loss and His Orchestra with vocal by Sam Browne was made in London on April 17, 1946. It was released by EMI on the HMV Records label as catalog number BD 5931.

Many other artists have recorded the song including Ella Fitzgerald for her 1968 Columbia album 30 by Ella and Rosemary Clooney for her album At Long Last (1998), and Sarah Blasko for her album Cinema Songs.

In popular culture
The Vaughn Monroe version was featured as a soundtrack and a radio song for the 2011 video game L.A. Noire.
It was the theme song of Arthur Godfrey on his radio programs and also played a central role in Woody Allen's 1977 film Annie Hall, where it is sung by Diane Keaton as the title character. Its inclusion in the latter helped "Seems Like Old Times" finish at #90 in AFI's 100 Years...100 Songs survey of top tunes in American cinema in 2004.

References 

Jazz songs
1945 songs
Songs written by Carmen Lombardo
Ella Fitzgerald songs
Guy Lombardo songs
Kate Smith songs
Vaughn Monroe songs